Hamish McColl (born 28 January 1962) is a British comedian, writer and actor. He trained at the École Philippe Gaulier, Paris and the University of Cambridge. With Sean Foley, he formed the double act The Right Size in 1988, creating comic theatre shows which toured all over the world. More recently he has worked as a screenwriter, scripting Mr. Bean's Holiday and Johnny English Reborn, plus contributing to the story of Paddington.

Theatre
 Ducktastic!, 2005
 Hysterium, A Funny Thing Happened on the Way to the Forum, Royal National Theatre, 2004
 The Play What I Wrote, 2001
 Mr Puntila, “Mr Puntila and his Man Matti”, Edinburgh International Festival, 1998

Filmography

Film

Writer

Acting credits

Television

Olivier Awards
 Best Entertainment 1999 Do You Come Here Often?
 Best New Comedy2001 The Play What I Wrote

References

External links

1962 births
Living people
Alumni of the University of Cambridge
British male film actors
British male comedians
Laurence Olivier Award winners
British male television actors
British male stage actors
British people of Scottish descent